Huarache may refer to:

Huarache (shoe), a Mexican sandal
Huarache (running shoe), a running sandal inspired by Tarahumara Indians
Huarache (food), a masa-based Mexican dish